Devon (born Kristie Marie Lisa; March 28, 1977) is an American pornographic film actress.

She has worked for Digital Playground and Shane's World, appearing in films for them and also directing for the latter. She has won a number of awards for her performances and was inducted into the AVN Hall of Fame in 2010.

Early life 
Devon was born Kristie Marie Lisa in Allentown, Pennsylvania.

Career 
Her first foray into the mainstream adult film industry came in 1998, when she appeared in the Jules Jordan film New Breed. She was the Penthouse Pet of the month in January 2001.

Devon worked for Vivid for three years (1998–2001). Her first release for Vivid was Country Comfort. After her Vivid contract, Devon signed with Digital Playground. In 2004, Devon appeared in the first WMV-HD DVD porn movie ever made, Island Fever 3, filmed on Tahiti and Bora Bora. In 2005, she co-starred in the adult film Pirates.

By January 2006, she signed with Ecstasy Mobile. In March 2006, she signed with Black Kat Productions, which never produced any films with Devon. 

In 2006, Devon formed her own production company. In October 2006, she signed a contract with Shane's World to appear in films and direct film scenes for the company. She made her directorial debut for Shane's World in April 2007 with Devon Does Baja. She says she is personally most proud of Virtual Sex with Devon (2001), saying she spent more time filming it than most other titles in which she appeared.

In 2010, Devon was inducted into the AVN Hall of Fame.

She returned to adult filming in 2012 and again in 2020.

Mainstream 
Devon appeared in the episode "Millennium" (Season 1, Episode 19) of The Man Show in 1999. She appeared with fellow Digital Playground contract performers Jesse Jane and Teagan Presley in an episode of HBO's Entourage, "I Love You Too", which aired July 31, 2005.

Personal life 
From 2001 to 2003, she was engaged to fellow pornographic actor Barrett Blade, who had managed her career from behind the scenes before working professionally onscreen with her. She describes their break-up as "difficult" and a contributing reason for her hiatus from the industry during the subsequent period. Prior to 2005, she dated Danny Ting, co-founder of WantedList, a pornographic DVD subscription site that sought to be the "Netflix of the porn industry".  She suffers from mild acrophobia. She believes being active in the sex industry has given her more confidence, making her more "outgoing and aggressive" about what she wants. She says she never watches her own films because she is too critical of herself, the only exception being the times when she has to do commentary on her own work. She has four cats and describes herself as "cute, honest and humorous". She has stated that the main difference between her industry persona and her real-life persona is her industry persona is more outgoing and flirtatious. She describes herself as irreligious.

In 2022, she was diagnosed with colon cancer.

Awards and nominations

References

External links 

 
 
 
 

1977 births
Living people
21st-century American actresses
Actresses from Allentown, Pennsylvania
American female adult models
American atheists
American pornographic film actresses
American pornographic film directors
American pornographic film producers
Female models from Allentown, Pennsylvania
Film directors from Pennsylvania
Penthouse Pets
Pornographic film actors from Pennsylvania
Saucon Valley High School alumni
Women pornographic film directors
Women pornographic film producers